Hua Ho Department Store is a retail department store chain in Brunei. It was founded by Lau Gim Kok in 1947; since then, the business has expanded rapidly in the country, followed by few agricultural farms to supply produce and poultry to the supermarket branches countrywide.

Locations
Hua Ho currently has eleven outlets which are located in Tanjong Bunut, Sengkurong, Manggis, Bebatik Kilanas, Kiulap, Delima, Gadong 2, Minimart, Tutong, Mulaut, Sungai Hanching and Yayasan.

Inhouse Brands
Due to increasing demand, Hua Ho has started to manufacture their own  inhouse brand, BONUS, which sells electrical and daily used goods such as tissues and detergents.

Loyalty Cards
Hua Ho have also introduced two loyalty cards:  the H2 card and the SYMB card. These two loyalty cards operate by different rewarding systems.

H2
The use of H2 card is applicable in 8 Hua Ho outlets, namely: 
Kiulap
Delima
Tutong
Gadong 2
Mini Mart
Mulaut
Bebatik Kilanas
Sungai Hanching

SYMB
In the year 2008, Hua Ho Department Store launched the SYMB Bonus Card for its outlets,
Sengkurong
Manggis
Tanjong Bunut
Yayasan

Controversy
During May 2015, reports spread throughout Brunei that Hua Ho were selling fake eggs imported from China. However, the Bruneian Department of Agriculture and Agrifoods quickly denied this allegation; simply saying, 'Hua Ho Department Store does not import chicken eggs from any external sources as the production at the Hua Ho farm is sufficient as sale stocks at their department stores.'

Closure of Yayasan branch
After 21 years of service at the SYMB branch, Hua Ho announced that the Yayasan branch will close its doors on 16 January 2018.

References

Further reading

External links
Hua Ho Department Store, Brunei Darussalam

Department stores of Brunei
Retail companies of Brunei
Retail companies established in 1947